Bonnie Elizabeth Bishop is a country rock singer-songwriter from Texas.

Education and early life 
Bishop graduated with a sociology degree from the University of Texas at Austin in 2001.

Career
In 2012, Bishop's idol Bonnie Raitt recorded the song "Not Cause I Wanted To." which she wrote with NRBQ guitarist "Big Al" Anderson. The song was selected as a New York Times Best Song of 2012 "Not Cause I Wanted To" and won a Grammy in 2013.  Raitt later recorded Bishop's song "Undone." Another song Bishop wrote entitled "The Best Songs Come From Broken Hearts" appeared on the 2013 TV show Nashville.

After a decade of touring Bishop took a break and attended graduate school at Sewanee – University of the South for creative writing. She was contacted by David Cobb and he produced her album "Ain’t Who I Was"  which was released in 2016 .

Albums
Bonnie Bishop (2002)
Long Way Home (2004)
Soft to the Touch (2005)
Bonnie Bishop and Friends: Live at Magnolia Avenue (2006)
 Things I Know (2009)
 Free (2012)
 Ain't Who I Was (2016)
 House Sessions Vol. 1 (2019)
 The Walk (2019)

References

External links 
Official Website

Country musicians from Texas
American women country singers
American country singer-songwriters
Living people
Year of birth missing (living people)
University of Texas at Austin College of Liberal Arts alumni
Singer-songwriters from Texas
21st-century American women